World Radio Day is an international day celebrated on 13 February each year. The Day was decided by UNESCO on 3 November 2011 during its 36th conference.

Background

Following a request from the Spanish Radio Academy on 20 September 2010, Spain proposed that the UNESCO Executive Board include an agenda item on the proclamation of a World Radio Day. UNESCO's Executive Board adds the agenda item in its provisional agenda for the proclamation of a "World Radio Day" on 29 September 2011. UNESCO carried out a wide consultation in 2011 with diverse stakeholders, such as broadcasting associations, UN agencies, funds and programmes, relevant NGOs, foundations and bilateral development agencies, as well as UNESCO Permanent Delegations and National Commissions for UNESCO. Among the answers, 91% were in favour of the project, including official support from the Arab States Broadcasting Union (ASBU), the Asia-Pacific Broadcasting Union (ABU), the African Union of Broadcasting (AUB), the Caribbean Broadcasting Union (CBU), the European Broadcasting Union (EBU), the International Association of Broadcasting (IAB), the North American Broadcasters Association (NABA), the Organización de Telecomunicaciones Ibeoramericanas (OTI), BBC, URTI, Vatican Radio, etc. The results of this consultation are available in UNESCO's document 187 EX/13.

The Board recommended to the UNESCO 36th session of the General Conference that it proclaim a World Radio Day at its 36th session and that this day is celebrated by UNESCO on 13 February, the anniversary of the day that the United Nations established the United Nations Radio in 1946. It also invited all United Nations Member States, organizations of the United Nations system and other international and regional organizations, professional associations, and broadcasting unions, as well as civil society, including non-governmental organizations and individuals, to duly celebrate World Radio Day, in the way that each considers most adequate. The board further requested that UNESCO's Director-General bring the resolution to the attention of the Secretary-General of the United Nations so that World Radio Day could be endorsed by the General Assembly and celebrated by the whole system. The matter was subsequently treated by UNESCO's General Conference, which adopted the resolution contained in file 36 C/63. World Radio Day was thus unanimously proclaimed by all Member States of UNESCO in November 2011.

In December 2012, The General Assembly of the UN endorsed the proclamation of World Radio Day, which thereby became a day to be celebrated by all UN agencies, funds, and programs and their partners. File
A/RES/67/124. Various radio industry bodies around the world are supporting the initiative by encouraging stations in developed countries to assist those in the developing world. At UNESCO, the consultation, proclamation, and celebrations were handled by Mirta Lourenco, Chief of the Sector for Media Development.

The first World Radio Day

In honor of the first World Radio Day in 2012, Lifeline Energy, Frontline SMS, SOAS Radio, and Empowerhouse hosted a seminar in London. A variety of practitioners, academics, and tool providers joined the School of Oriental and African Studies to explore ways in which radio reaches even the most remote and vulnerable communities. Speakers included Guy Berger (Director for Freedom of Expression and Media Development at UNESCO), Dr. Chege Githiora (Chairman of the Centre of African Studies at SOAS), Birgitte Jallov (Empowerhouse/ Panos London), Amy O'Donnell (FrontlineSMS: Radio), Carlos Chirinos (SOAS Radio), and Linje Manyozo (LSE). The panel was moderated by Lucy Durán (SOAS, BBC Radio 3, Human Planet).  At the University of Pisa in Italy, a public event was held on 13 February 2012 to commemorate World Radio Day. The event was organized by Italradio and the Faculty of Engineering and Telecommunication and focused on the cost and ease of use of radio as a source of information. Pisa was chosen as the first Italian city to host an intercontinental radio station built by Marconi in the early years of the 20th century.

In 2012, in Barcelona, Spain, a public event organized by the College of Telecommunications Engineers of Catalunya (COETTC) was held on 21 February 2012 to commemorate World Radio Day. The event was organized with the help of the Government of Catalonia. There were panelists from radio stations and personalities from the world of radio broadcasting in attendance. The main event was a panel discussion entitled "For a more global and competitive radio". In Switzerland, the European Broadcasting Union organized a Digital Radio Week. This was a series of technical events starting on 13 February 2012, with the participation of the main radio standardization organizations: DRM Consortium, WorldDMB, RadioDNS. There was also a local digital radio transmission in DAB+ demonstrating the democratization of transmission for smaller structures, using CRC mmbTools open software-defined radio tools.

Bangladesh NGOs Network for Radio and Communication (BNNRC) promotes the observance of World Radio Day on 13 February in collaboration with public service Broadcasting, Commercial broadcasting & Community Broadcasting at the local and national levels. The World Radio Day Observation National Committee was established in Bangladesh for this purpose.

World Radio Day 2014

World Radio Day 2014 had the theme Gender Equality and Women's Empowerment in Radio proposed by UNESCO. Its sub-themes included:
 Sensitizing radio station owners, executives, journalists, and governments to develop gender-related policies and strategies for radio
 Eliminating stereotypes and promoting multidimensional portrayal in radio
 Building radio skills for youth radio production, with a focus on girls as producers, hosts, reporters
 Promoting the safety of women radio journalists
The multilingual event website offered several copyright-free audio/video messages for rebroadcasting and diffusion, as well as an interactive map for submitting events related to the celebration of the day. Thematic infographics can be found in English, French, and Spanish.

World Radio Day 2015
World Radio Day 2015 was held on 13 February 2015 around the theme of Youth and Radio, to increase the participation of young people in radio. The sub-themes of the Day were:
 Showcasing the multiple uses of radio as a medium
 Highlighting the contribution of young people as creators of radio content and improving their participation
 Building awareness of the security and safety risks faced by young international freelancers and fixers, especially in humanitarian and disaster zones

World Radio Day 2016
World Radio Day 2016 was held on 13 February 2016 around the theme of  Radio in Times of Emergency and Disaster, to build partnerships with the humanitarian and emergency sector, as well as the community at large. The sub-themes of the Day were:
 Securing freedom of expression and journalists' safety
 Using radio to empower survivors and vulnerable people, whose right to privacy is to be respected
 Radio's social impact, providing access to information and protecting information rights.
 Saving lives through radio
 The immediate accessibility of radio frequencies when saving lives
More than 320 events were held in more than 80 countries around the world to mark the Day, with 19 radio stations from around the world coming to UNESCO Headquarters to broadcast live.

World Radio Day 2017
World Radio Day 2017 was held on 13 February 2017 around the theme of " Radio is You", to celebrate how audiences interact with radio. The theme was designed to encourage radio stations to be the best they can, be by having audience engagement policies, ethical committees, public editors, and self-review programs, and by ensuring their community radio networks were strong. A record number of countries, took part in World Radio Day 2017, with more than 500 events worldwide.  
 The theme "Radio is You" was chosen to ensure that audiences' views and diversity were respected
 The theme looked at the ways that audiences engage with radio, both on-air and in the planning and policy phases

World Radio Day 2018

World Radio Day 2018 was held on 13 February 2018 around the theme of " Radio and Sports" to celebrate momentous sporting events. World Radio Day 2018 celebrated traditional sports that connect people to their cultural heritage, the grassroots sports that play important roles in communities, and how sports challenges gender stereotypes and provide positive role models for young people around the world. 
The theme for 2018 focused on the alliance of sport and radio as a force for civic participation and development, as well as for celebrating humanity in its diversity. World Radio day 2018 celebrated radio's critical function in shaping this alliance, by providing a platform for radio stations, and listeners alike, to construct their programs and conversations around Radio and Sports.
The sub-themes were:
 Building and uniting communities 
 Participation and inclusion 
 Goodwill and inspiring humanity 

How radio impacts our lives

World Radio Day 2019
World Radio Day 2019 was held on Wednesday 13 February around the theme of " Dialogue, Tolerance, and Peace."

More events were held in more than 80 countries around the world to mark the Day, with radio stations from around the world coming to UNESCO Headquarters in Paris to gain hands-on experience of radio production, as we celebrate the impact of radio in the pursuit of a more peaceful and tolerant world.

World Radio Day 2020
World Radio Day 2020 was held on Thursday 13 February around the theme of " Radio and diversity."
UNESCO and the UN called on radio stations to uphold diversity, both in their newsroom and on the airwaves.

This edition of World Radio Day was divided into three main sub-themes:

  Advocating for pluralism in radio, including a mix of public, private, and community broadcasters;
  Encouraging representation in the newsroom, with teams representing diverse social groups;
  Promoting a diversity of editorial content and program types reflecting the variety of the audiences.

In the world, radio remains the most widely consumed medium. This unique ability to reach out to the widest audience means radio can shape a society's experience of diversity, and stand as an arena for all voices to speak out, be represented, and be heard. Radio stations should serve diverse communities, offering a wide variety of programs, viewpoints, and content, and reflect the diversity of audiences in their organizations and operations. Technological advances are also participating in the diversity of the radio sector: DAB+, DRM, and IP streaming.

World Radio Day 2021
In 2021, UNESCO invited stations to celebrate the 10th anniversary of this event and more than a century of radio.

This edition of the WRD focused on three sub-themes:

 EVOLUTION. The world is changing, radio is evolving. This sub-theme refers to the resilience of radio, to its sustainability;
 INNOVATION. The world is changing, radio is adapting and innovating. Radio has had to adapt to new technologies to remain the medium of mobility par excellence, accessible to all and everywhere
 CONNECT. The world is changing, and radio connects. This sub-theme highlights the services provided by radio to our society / Natural disasters, socioeconomic crises, epidemics, etc ... This day will include 6 hours in two different programs and Off sequences, all broadcast live on Youtube, Facebook, and Twitch.

To mark this event on Saturday, the BBC World Service has some special content to be broadcast over the weekend.

World Radio Day 2022
World Radio Day 2022 was held on 13 February 2022. The theme of the 2022 edition of World Radio Day was thus devoted to "Radio and Trust". On the occasion of World Radio Day 2022, UNESCO calls on radio stations worldwide to celebrate this event’s 11th edition and more than a century of radio.

World Radio Day 2023
World Radio Day 2023 The theme for the 12th edition of the World Radio Day, to be celebrated on Monday February 13th is “Radio and Peace“. UNESCO highlights independent radio as a pillar for conflict prevention and peacebuilding.

SAQ Grimeton Radio Station from Sweden scheduled to air on 17.2 kHz.

International Committee of Radio (World Radio Day Committee) 

This committee was born in 2012 after the proclamation of UNESCO's World Radio Day. The idea came from the president of the Spanish Radio Academy, Jorge Alvarez. This committee consists of the most important radio broadcast organizations: ITU-International Telecommunication Union, Spanish Radio Academy, IAB-International Association of Broadcasting, ABU-Asia-Pacific Broadcasting Union, ASBU-Arab States Broadcasting Union, EBU/UER-European Broadcasting Union, AER-Association of European Radios, AMARC-World Association of Community Radio Broadcasters, AIBD-Asia Pacific Institute for Broadcasting Development, BNNRC-Bangladesh NGOs Network for Radio and Communication, URTI-International Radio and Television Union and AUB/UAR-The African Union of Broadcasting. The Founding Act was signed on March 12, 2012.

Radio stations around the world are invited to promote the official interactive platform wrd13.com of the international WRD Committee by proposing to their listeners to deposit audio messages on it, in any language, which they will be able to download for broadcasting all day long on 13 February.

United Nations info 
The celebration of World Radio Day corresponds to the date of creation of the United Nations Radio (UN Radio), on 13 February 1946.Informative Website of this celebration

Stephane Dujarric (DPI) on World Radio Day 2014
13 February 2014 - 	"UN Radio won a well-deserved "International Academy Award 2014" on 13 February on World Radio Day. The Award was presented by the Government of Spain and the Spanish Academy Awards which spearheaded the establishment of World Radio Day by UNESCO. The Award is presented every year on World Radio Day to the personalities and media houses whose work has made a huge difference worldwide and this year the academy presented the first-ever international Academy Award which UN Radio happens to be the first recipient of."

World Radio Day 2014 - interview with Stephane Dujarric

4 February 2014 - 	In honor of World Radio Day 2014, Elena Vapnitchnaia, Chief of the Russian UN Radio sits with Stephane Dujarric, Director of the News and Media Division in the UN Department of Public Information, to discuss the past and future of UN Radio.

Resolutions adopted by the General Assembly of the United Nations:
Sixty-seventh session,18 December 2012:
                 
"Endorses the resolution adopted by the General Conference of the United Nations Educational, Scientific and Cultural Organization at its thirty-sixth session, proclaiming 13 February, the day United Nations Radio was established in 1946, as World Radio Day"

Public Radio Broadcasting Day 
Public Radio Broadcasting Day is observed annually on January 13, the day Lee de Forest transmitted the first public broadcast in 1910.

References

External links
Unesco's website for World Radio Day
International Radio and Television Union
European Broadcast Union
Academia Española de la Radio
Academy of Radio Arts & Sciences

United Nations days
February observances
UNESCO
Radio organizations